Diananda Choirunisa (born 16 March 1997) is an Indonesian recurve archer.

She competed in the individual recurve event and the team recurve event at the 2015 World Archery Championships in Copenhagen, Denmark.

Diananda Choirunisa still 20 years old when she started to become an Indonesian archery athlete in the 2017 Southeast Asian Games. This girl took Psychological education at Airlangga University, East Java and she is a native of Surabaya.

Diananda also won gold medal in 2016 National Sports Week as a representative from East Java. In the 2017 Southeast Asian Games, Diananda managed to contribute two golds from the individual category and mixed recurve.

She represented Indonesia at the 2020 Summer Olympics, in the Women's individual and Mixed team category.

References

External links

1997 births
Living people
Sportspeople from Surabaya
Indonesian female archers
Archers at the 2014 Summer Youth Olympics
Archers at the 2020 Summer Olympics
Olympic archers of Indonesia
Archers at the 2014 Asian Games
Archers at the 2018 Asian Games
Asian Games silver medalists for Indonesia
Asian Games medalists in archery
Medalists at the 2018 Asian Games
Competitors at the 2013 Southeast Asian Games
Competitors at the 2015 Southeast Asian Games
Competitors at the 2017 Southeast Asian Games
Competitors at the 2019 Southeast Asian Games
Southeast Asian Games gold medalists for Indonesia
Southeast Asian Games silver medalists for Indonesia
Southeast Asian Games bronze medalists for Indonesia
Southeast Asian Games medalists in archery
Islamic Solidarity Games medalists in archery
Islamic Solidarity Games competitors for Indonesia
21st-century Indonesian women